Marina Satti (born 26 December 1986) is a Greek singer, songwriter, and music producer.

Early life and studies
Satti was born in Athens, Greece, to a Sudanese Arab father and a Greek mother, and raised in Heraklion, Crete. She began classical piano training at an early age and classical vocal training in high school. She enrolled at the National Technical University of Athens to study architecture without graduating.

In 2008, after studying with the baritone Panos Dimas, Satti earned a first degree in lyrical monody with honors and a first prize. One year later, she earned a second degree in advanced classical studies, while also studying jazz at the Nakas Conservatory. In 2010, she completed two semesters in jazz composition and also in contemporary writing & production at the Berklee College of Music through a scholarship.

Career
In 2016, Satti released her single "Koupes" ("Cups"), which reached more than 24 million views on YouTube, and was included in Ravin & Bob Sinclar's Buddha Bar 20 Years Anniversary album. In 2017, her next single, "Mantissa" ("Seeress"), charted in the European Union's Official Top 100 and Bulgaria's Top 40. Global Citizen named it "song of the summer." Joanna Kakissis, Athens-based correspondent for NPR, described it as "the summer hit that fills a generation with hope".

In 2016, Satti founded  ("voices," in approximate Greek transliteration), a female, a cappella group performing traditional polyphonic songs. They've performed at venues such as the Ancient Theatre of Epidaurus, the Odeon of Herodes Atticus, the Athens Concert Hall, and the Stavros Niarchos Foundation Cultural Center.

In 2017, Satti curated a series of cultural events that led to the formation of the choir  (in Greek, a word in-between "countries" and "choruses"), consisting of 150 women aged 13–55. In 2020,  presented traditional songs in archeological locations.

In June 2018, Satti and  presented YALLA!, a repertoire of world music and pop compositions, as well as renditions of Eastern Mediterranean traditional music, which was first performed at the Melina Merkouri Theater and then toured abroad to France, England, Switzerland, as well as to Tampere, Finland, for the 2019 World Music Expo.

Theater
She has worked  as actress or music score composer with the National Theater of Greece, the Greek National Opera, the Athens Festival, and others.

Discography

Singles

Albums

References

1986 births
Living people
Greek television actresses
21st-century Greek women singers
Greek voice actresses
Berklee College of Music alumni
Greek people of Sudanese descent
Musicians from Heraklion